Aldhal is a village in Belgaum district in the southern state of Karnataka, India. Administratively, it is part of the Naganur K D gram panchayat in Hukeri Taluka.

References

Villages in Belagavi district